The Complex were an Irish punk rock band formed in 1979 in Dublin. The band's membership consisted of Liam Ó Maonlaí (vocals, guitar), Kevin Shields (guitar), Colm Ó Cíosóig (drums) and a bassist known only as Mark. The Complex disbanded in 1981 after Ó Maonlaí's departure. Although unsuccessful on the Dublin post-punk music scene, members of The Complex later formed successful alternative rock bands, including My Bloody Valentine and Hothouse Flowers.

History

Formation: 1979–1980
The Complex formed circa 1979 when 16-year-old guitarist Kevin Shields and 14-year-old drummer Colm Ó Cíosóig answered an advertisement "placed by some 12-year-old kid called Mark." Shields and Ó Cíosóig had become acquainted a couple of months prior, in what was described as an "almost overnight friendship." Liam Ó Maonlaí, a friend of Ó Cíosóig's who attended school with him in Coláiste Eoin in Booterstown, was recruited as lead vocalist and second guitarist and the band began rehearsing, which was described as "an every Sunday type of thing." Shields has said that The Complex formed out of "what all the nerds and weirdos actually do as opposed to the cool people with the leather jackets." According to Shields, the band played "a handful of gigs" during their short lived career—the first of which included cover versions of Sex Pistols and Ramones songs.

Disbandment: 1981
The Complex are estimated to have been active from six months to twelve months, according to different sources. The band disbanded when Ó Maonlaí left to form Hothouse Flowers, after which Shields and Ó Cíosóig began rehearsing with a bassist who Shields described as "your typical early [1980s], slightly funky Gang of Four type guy." The trio formed another band, A Life in the Day, which focused on a more post-punk sound influenced by Siouxsie and the Banshees and Joy Division. The band "had a tape and gigged around" but failed to secure performances with more than a hundred people. In 1983, Shields and Ó'Cíosóig formed My Bloody Valentine with lead vocalist David Conway, who performed under the pseudonym Dave Stelfox.

Musical style
During an interview with Buddyhead, Shields described The Complex's sound as "just punk rock". He added that the band performed a style of punk that was "somewhere between oi punk and older punk." Shields was influenced by the Ramones, particularly guitarist Johnny Ramone, whom he referred to as "a noise generator". Ó Maonlaí often attempted to sing in "a hard kind of voice, like John Lydon [...] but always at a drop of a hat he'd be singing away doing Elvis," according to Shields. He added that Ó Maonlai was more accustomed to "that kind of singing rather than the post-punk thing", which led to the formation of Hothouse Flowers.

In a 2013 interview with Pitchfork Media, Shields revealed that during his time in The Complex in 1981, he first experimented with pitch bending, a guitar technique that later became a trademark of My Bloody Valentines sound, and planned to release recordings from the period on a streaming service.

Members
Liam Ó Maonlaí – vocals, guitar (1979–1981)
Kevin Shields – guitar (1979–1981)
Colm Ó Cíosóig – drums, percussion (1979–1981)
Mark – bass (1979–1981)

References

Bibliography

Irish punk rock groups
Musical groups from Dublin (city)
Musical groups established in 1979
Musical groups disestablished in 1981
1979 establishments in Ireland
1981 disestablishments in Ireland
My Bloody Valentine (band)